Michael James Riconosciuto is an electronics and computer expert who was arrested in early 1991, shortly after providing Inslaw, Inc. with an affidavit in support of their lawsuit against the U.S. Dept. of Justice.
Riconosciuto professed a defense centered on the Inslaw Affair (a legal case in which the U.S. Government was charged with illegal use of computer software). Riconosciuto claimed to have reprogrammed Inslaw's case-management program (Promis) with a secret "back-door"
to allow clandestine tracking of individuals. Riconosciuto stated that he had been threatened with prosecution by a justice department official. Riconosciuto provided an affidavit detailing threats to a House Select Committee investigating the Inslaw Affair.

Early life

Riconoscuito has demonstrated some technical and scientific talents. As a teenager, he constructed a working argon laser, a feat that earned him an invitation to Stanford University as a research assistant.

Riconosciuto was employed as an engineer at a mine in Maricopa, California. Hercules Properties, Ltd. had raised financing and purchased a  contaminated waste-disposal site which had once been a portion of a  TNT and fertilizer manufacturer known as Hercules Powder Works.

Allegations

"October Surprise"
Riconosciuto stated in 1993 that he had knowledge of the October Surprise conspiracy allegations.

Cabazon murders
Nathan Baca's Emmy winning series "The Octopus Murders" featured documents from the archives of Michael Riconosciuto. These documents have been the subject of interest for recently reopened cold case homicide investigations.

Inslaw Affair
In early 1991, Riconosciuto filed an affidavit before a House judiciary committee investigating the bankruptcy case of Inslaw Inc. v. United States Government. Riconosciuto was called to testify before Congress regarding the modification of PROMIS, a case-management software program that had been developed for the Department of Justice by Washington, D.C.-based Inslaw Inc. Riconosciuto declared that he had been under the direction of Earl Brian, who was then a controlling shareholder and director of Hadron, Inc.

Within eight days of this declaration, Riconosciuto was arrested for conspiracy to manufacture, conspiracy to distribute, possession with intent to distribute, and with distribution—a total of ten counts related to methamphetamine and methadone.

During his trial, Riconosciuto accused the Drug Enforcement Administration of stealing two copies of his tape. Riconosciuto also stated that he himself had disposed of a third tape.

In addition to his claims of a government "frame up" related to Inslaw, Riconosciuto maintained that the chemical laboratory on his property was in use for the extraction of precious metals such as platinum in a highly specialized mining operation.

No drug-lab contamination was found at the laboratory site and a member of the DOE's Hazardous Spill Response Team asserted that high barium levels on the property were unlikely to be the result of Riconosciuto's work.  Barium does have specialized usage for metallurgy with regards to the processing of platinum group metals.

In his investigation of the allegations surrounding the Inslaw case, Special Counsel Nicholas J. Bua was particularly critical of several of Inslaw's witnesses. He found that Riconosciuto had given inconsistent accounts in statements to the Hamiltons, his affidavit, and in testimony at his 1992 trial for manufacturing methamphetamine. Bua compared Riconosciuto's story about Promis to "a historical novel; a tale of total fiction woven against the background of accurate historical facts.".

References

Further reading
 "The Plot Thickens in PROMIS Affair" (Part II)—"PROMIS Trail Leads to Justice", (Part III)—"PROMIS Spins Web of Intrigue", (Part IV)

External links
Michael Riconosciuto Document Archive

Living people
American people of Italian descent
Place of birth missing (living people)
Year of birth missing (living people)
People from Tacoma, Washington
American people convicted of drug offenses
Prisoners and detainees of the United States federal government